The Reich Music Examination Office (German: Reichsmusikprüfstelle) was an organisation within the Reich Ministry for Popular Enlightenment and Propaganda whose role was to prevent the distribution of 'undesirable' music within Nazi Germany. In doing so, it worked in conjunction with the Music Chamber of the Reich Chamber of Culture.

Degenerate music

The Office was established as a result of an 'Order Concerning Undesirable and Dangerous Music', issued by the Music Chamber in December 1937. Heinz Drewes became the Office's first director. Initially, the Office's remit was to screen all foreign music before publication or distribution, but in March 1939, this role expanded to encompass all music. As this task was too great for one bureau to deal with, publishers were only under compulsion to submit music to the Office if it was requested, although some composers submitted their own compositions anyway.

As part of its work, the Reich Music Examination Office published lists of 'undesirable' compositions, the first of which was produced on 31 August 1938 and published in the Music Chamber's official journal on 1 September. Several more of these lists were published. In practice, very few compositions were actually banned, as the mere existence of the office had a self-regulatory effect. Much of the banned material comprised what the Nazis called degenerate music, such as jazz or negermusik as well as the compositions of Jewish composers like Mahler.

See also
 Degenerate music
 Music in Nazi Germany
 Negermusik
 Reich Chamber of Music

References
Notes

Sources
 Kater, Michael H. (1997) The Twisted Muse: Musicians and their Music in the Third Reich
 Steinweis, Alan E. (1993) Art, Ideology, and Economics in Nazi Germany: The Reich Chambers of Music, Theater, and the Visual Arts

External links
 "Degenerate" Music in Nazi Germany

Music organisations based in Germany
Modernism (music)
Nazi culture
Nazi propaganda organizations
Censorship in Germany
Government agencies established in 1937
1937 establishments in Germany
Musical groups established in 1937
1937 in music